IEN Italia (Industrial Engineering News) is an Italian magazine launched in 1999 for industry professionals. It is published by the Italian office of Thomas Industrial Media BVBA whose offices are located in Mechelen, Belgium.

Informations
10 times a year, IEN Italia, provides a digest of the latest products news and technologies available on the Italian market.
In 2009, nearly 14 000 subscribers received IEN Italia, mostly engineers and purchasing managers. IEN Italia also publishes newsletters and updates its website with daily news about new products and services available to the Italian market.

IEN Italia''' is published in Super A4 format since 2009, in a new style and with an enriched content. It covers articles on latest technologies, interviews and views from market leaders, application stories as well as industry news.

The headquarters of the publication is located in Milano, Italy.

Thomas Industrial media BVBA is also present in France, Germany and Turkey.
Thomas Industrial media BVBA publishes as well other industrial publications and websites across Europe.

In English and distributed all across Europe:
Industrial Engineering News Europe (IEN)
Processing and Control News Europe (PCN)
Power In Motion (PIM)
In French and distributed in France:
Produits Equipements Industriels (PEI)
In German and distributed in Germany:
Technische Revue (TR)
In Italian and distributed in Italy:Manutenzione Tecnica e ManagementIl Distributore IndustrialeIn Turkish and distributed in Turkey:Endustri Dunyasi''

Circulation
The magazine is free and available only on request for industry professionals. Over 13 000 copies are distributed ten times a year.

See also
List of magazines published in Italy

External links
 IEN Italia's website
 Thomas Industrial Media's website
 Thomas Publishing Co's website

1999 establishments in Italy
Engineering magazines
Magazines established in 1999
Magazines published in Milan
Mass media in Mechelen
Ten times annually magazines